S2S Pte. Ltd. was a Japanese record label founded by Ken Suzuki.

History
S2S was founded and established in Singapore in October 1997 as an artist management and production house- S2S Pte Ltd. In 1999, S2S Inc, Japan was set up as a distribution, artist management and publishing company in Tokyo, Japan. S2S Pte Ltd is the head office for all business functions, such as the duties of communication, liaising and licensing on the behalf of S2S Inc, Japan. S2S Pte Ltd has managed to build a very strong network across Asia.

On September 30, 2015, S2S and its distribution arm, Sense Corporation, ceased operations in Singapore and the rest of South-east Asia, Hong Kong and Taiwan.

Founder

Ken Suzuki was the founder of S2S. He was also one of the three founders of Avex Trax, Japan. Avex Trax is one of the most successful independent record labels in Japan.

Talent Management 

As an artiste management/production house and publishing company, S2S Pte Ltd and S2S Inc have signed several promising and talented artistes in both Japan and Singapore, to groom into stars. As the company has a close working relationship with several major record labels in Japan, their artistes have collaborated with many well-known producers and musicians in that territory. Hence, through their strong presence and business relations in Japan, their artistes have had songs released on singles, albums and compilations distributed by major retailers and distributors.

Artistes

Labels

‘INCENSE RECORDS’ – the label was formed to provide the sound to all the moods in your life. It is the home for Downtempo and Subtle, Nu Jazz, Electronica, Sexy House, Chilled Drum n’ Bass and Chillout releases. The concept and sound is, think sexy, funky and contemporary grooves that are designed and guaranteed to soothe but also to stimulate your aural senses.

‘HIGHDIVE MUSIC’ – Focuses on club music, dance, soul, R&B and rock and pop.

‘CITI KAYAK’ – Focuses on genres such as rock, hiphop and hardcore.

‘SMOOVE RECORDS’ – Focuses on broken beat, nu jazz, soul, funk, and house. One of the best selling albums from this label is Late Night Moods compilations. This series has been doing very well in Asia, and is recognized as a premier bossa nova chill album.

‘MAJOR CHORD RECORDS’ – Focuses on the adult contemporary sound and is targeted towards High Fidelity enthusiasts. The recording techniques and mastering processes of this label is tailored for discerning sound connoisseurs. Most Jazz artistes come under this label in the "Hi Fi Room presents" series.

"ABSOLUTE AUDIOPHILE" – Focuses on music for audiophile fanatics who value sound quality.

‘SENSE MUSIC’ – This Company was formed on 1 August 2004 and is based in Singapore. Its primary function is to distribute all S2S CD releases and other CDs (from Japan) within Asia except Japan.

See also
 List of record labels
 Avex Group (Ken Suzuki's company from 1988–1997 and S2S' distributor in Japan)

References

S2S Corporate Profile - English/Japanese - Official Website

External links 
 Official homepage

Japanese record labels
Singaporean record labels
Record labels established in 1997